Laurens Vanthoor (born 8 May 1991) is a Belgian professional racing driver currently racing for Porsche Motorsport as a factory driver in the IMSA WeatherTech SportsCar Championship. He currently resides in Waiblingen outside of Stuttgart.

Early career

Karting
Born in Hasselt, Vanthoor began his kart racing career at an early age. In 2005 he became French and Belgian Champion in the ICA-J class and he also finished fourth in the European Championship.

In 2007 Vanthoor become an official factory driver for the CRG racing team in the KF2 category. He ended up being out of action for five months out due to an accident, resulting in six fractures. His best result in the season was a runner-up position in the North European Championship.

2008-2011: Formula Three
Vanthoor began his formula racing career in the 2008 German Formula Three season, jumping from karting directly into Formula Three. He finished fourth overall in the championship, with two wins and three poles. Following his successes, the Belgian Automobile Club (RACB) made him a member of their "National Team" initiative and Volkswagen Motorsport made him an official driver. Vanthoor also became the youngest driver ever in the history of the Macau Grand Prix and he finished in sixth position.

With Frédéric Vervisch and Sebastián Saavedra both moving Stateside and Johnny Cecotto Jr. moving up to the F3 Euroseries and GP2, Vanthoor became the main title contender for the 2009 season. Vanthoor followed Vervisch's lead of 2008 by dominating the field, wrapping up the title at the Nürburgring.

He moved into the Formula Three Euroseries for the 2010 season with Signature and stayed with the team for the 2011 season. He scored several podium finishes but never won a race.

Sportscar career

2012: FIA GT1
In 2012 he switched to the FIA GT1 World Championship with WRT. Together with Stéphane Ortelli, he won both the qualifying and championship races at the first round at Nogaro.

2013-2016: Audi Sport Factory Driver

In 2013 he won the FIA GT Series together with Ortelli for Audi and WRT. In 2014 he competed in the Blancpain Sprint Series and Blancpain Endurance Series, winning the latter as well as the overall Blancpain GT Series. He also won the 2014 24 Hours of Spa for WRT together with fellow Audi Sport factory drivers Rene Rast and Markus Winkelhock

In 2015, he started his season in the Bathurst 12 Hour with Phoenix Racing. He took the pole with a new lap record and ended 2nd. He also drove in Brazil for the 1st round of the Stock Car Brasil together with Valdeno Brito for Shell Racing at Goiania. Together with Belgian Audi Club Team WRT he won the 24 Hours of Nürburgring in the new Audi R8 LMS 2015 specification. On 3 October, during the event at Misano for the Blancpain Sprint Series, he was involved in a major crash which led to a serious injury. Therefore, he missed the last race of the season as well as the race at Macau, where he was replaced by René Rast. He made his comeback at the Sepang 12 Hours, which he won with Stéphane Ortelli and Stuart Leonard.

In 2016, he started his season with a win in the Dubai 24 Hour with Belgian Audi Club Team WRT. On 21 November 2016 Vanthoor won the FIA GT World Cup, crowning himself as World Champion on the streets of Macau. On 3 December 2016, it was announced that Vanthoor would change from Audi to Porsche and the focus would be on the WeatherTech SportsCar Championship where he will drive a Porsche 911 RSR together with Kevin Estre. During his last race with Audi, he won the Sepang 12 Hours together with Robin Frijns, Christopher Haase and Phoenix Racing. With this he crowned himself as the first winner of the Intercontinental GT Challenge.

2017-2021: Porsche Factory Driver in IMSA
In 2017, he started his season at the Daytona 24 Hours with his new employer Porsche, in the WeatherTech SportsCar Championship. Together with Kevin Estre and Richard Lietz, he finished 10th overall and 6th in the GTLM-class with the new 2017-specification Porsche 911 RSR. After a relatively difficult first season Vanthoor took his first win at the 2018 Mid-Ohio round. 

During the 2018 season Vanthoor also completed the Porsche Le Mans line-up for the #92 car together with Kevin Estre and Michael Christensen in the iconic “pink pig” livery. After taking the lead early on the team went on to win the GTE Pro class at the 2018 Le Mans 24 Hours. The following season Vanthoor won the WeatherTech SportsCar Championship in the GTLM class for Porsche together with Earl Bamber. The duo took a total of three wins and seven podiums in eleven races. Porsche eventually decided to end its factory involvement in the GTLM class at the end of the 2020 season leaving Vanthoor out of a factory program for the following season. 

However, Vanthoor was kept as a Porsche factory driver and loaned out to customer team Pfaff Motorsports for the 2021 IMSA season. He and his teammate Zacharie Robichon won the championship in the GTD class. Vanthoor also won the 24 Hours of Spa a second time in 2020 driving a Porsche 911 GT3 R entered by Rowe Racing.

2022: Deutsche Tourenwagen Masters
In 2022 Vanthoor participated in the Deutsche Tourenwagen Masters for SSR Performance, driving a Porsche 911 GT3 R.

Hypercar career
For the 2023 season, Vanthoor moved into the Hypercar class of the FIA World Endurance Championship, partnering Kévin Estre and André Lotterer at the Porsche Penske Motorsport works team.

Racing record

Career summary

† As Vanthoor was a guest driver, he was ineligible for points.
* Season still in progress.

Complete Formula 3 Euro Series results
(key)

FIA GT competition results

Complete GT1 World Championship results

Complete FIA GT Series results

Complete Blancpain GT Series Sprint Cup results

Complete Intercontinental GT Challenge results

* Season still in progress.

Complete 24 Hours of Le Mans results

Complete FIA World Endurance Championship results

* Season still in progress.

Complete European Le Mans Series results

Complete IMSA SportsCar Championship results
(key) (Races in bold indicate pole position) (Races in italics indicate fastest lap)

* Season still in progress.

Complete Stock Car Brasil results
(key) (Races in bold indicate pole position) (Races in italics indicate fastest lap)

† As Vanthoor was a guest driver, he was ineligible for points.

Complete Deutsche Tourenwagen Masters results
(key) (Races in bold indicate pole position; races in italics indicate fastest lap)

References

External links
 
 
 

1991 births
Living people
Sportspeople from Hasselt
Belgian racing drivers
German Formula Three Championship drivers
Formula 3 Euro Series drivers
FIA GT1 World Championship drivers
Blancpain Endurance Series drivers
Superstars Series drivers
24 Hours of Le Mans drivers
24 Hours of Spa drivers
Stock Car Brasil drivers
WeatherTech SportsCar Championship drivers
24 Hours of Daytona drivers
European Le Mans Series drivers
FIA World Endurance Championship drivers
Deutsche Tourenwagen Masters drivers
Porsche Motorsports drivers
Van Amersfoort Racing drivers
RC Motorsport drivers
Carlin racing drivers
Signature Team drivers
W Racing Team drivers
Audi Sport drivers
OAK Racing drivers
Rowe Racing drivers
KCMG drivers
Phoenix Racing drivers
Meyer Shank Racing drivers
Nürburgring 24 Hours drivers
24H Series drivers
Craft-Bamboo Racing drivers
Team Penske drivers